Jeff Merritt (born May 16, 1978) is an internationally-recognized leader in the area of urban development, smart cities, the internet of things (IoT), emerging technology and government innovation. He currently serves as Head of Urban Transformation for the World Economic Forum. Merritt previously worked as Director of Innovation for the City of New York as part of the Mayor's Office of Technology and Innovation. He is also known for his work as founder of the New York City nonprofit organization, Grassroots Initiative, where he helped organize the first exclusively online public election in the United States.

Career

Merritt began his career working with U.S. State Department-sponsored programs in Croatia, Macedonia, Albania, Serbia and Montenegro. Based on his experiences with democracy promotion in the Balkans, Merritt co-authored Transacting Transition, The Micropolitics of Democracy Assistance in the Former Yugoslavia (Kumarian Press, 2006).

From 2003 to 2005, Merritt served as executive director for the Center for Civic Responsibility. In 2005, he founded Grassroots Initiative, a nonprofit organization that seeks to "provide easy political access for underrepresented groups and other political outsiders". In 2006, as president of Grassroots Initiative, Merritt helped elect the first Sikhs to political office in New York City. In 2009, under contract from the New York City Department of Education, Merritt helped promote the first exclusively online public election in the United States.

In 2010, Merritt joined the office of New York City Public Advocate Bill de Blasio and in 2012 was named one of city and state's "New York City Rising Stars: 40 Under 40" for his work there as senior advisor.  At the Public Advocate's office, Merritt helped develop New York City's Worst Landlord Watchlist, a first-of-its-kind tool to allow tenants to look up a current or potential landlord to see code violations in that landlord’s buildings. The tool was expanded through a partnership with Craigslist in 2011 and replicated by the City of Vancouver in 2012. Merritt also led the Public Advocate's open government and technology initiatives and national coalitions on issues of corporate political spending and gun divestment.

Following the election of de Blasio as Mayor of New York City, Merritt helped establish the Mayor's Office of Technology and Innovation. As part of the Mayor's Office, Merritt led a range of technology efforts including the launch of the .nyc top-level domain, development of outreach systems for the expansion of pre-k in New York City, and the announcement of LinkNYC, New York City's plan to build the largest and fastest municipal Wi-Fi network in the world. As the City's Director of Innovation, Merritt oversaw smart city efforts for New York City which included a focus on "expanding Internet connectivity across the five boroughs to unleash new opportunities, growing the local innovation economy and accelerating public-private partnerships, working with communities to develop solutions that meet neighbourhood needs, and always putting New Yorkers first when we test and deploy new technologies."

In November 2017, Merritt joined the World Economic Forum as Head of IoT and Connected Devices as part of the Center for the Fourth Industrial Revolution. The Center advertises itself as a way of maximizing the benefits of science and technology for society and designing "new approaches to policy and governance" through public-private partnerships with government, industry and experts from around the world.  
In 2019, the World Economic Forum (WEF) launched the G20 Global Smart Cities Alliance, an initiative that brought together the world’s leading city networks and technology governance organizations to advance the ethical use of smart city technologies and develop global standards. The WEF's announcement was noted by Jeff Merrit as a "critical step to accelerate global best practices, mitigate risks, and foster greater openness and public trust regarding the collection of data in public spaces".

In August 2021, World Economic Forum established a new global Centre for Urban Transformation with its headquarters in Detroit. The Centre, which is led by Merritt, is a partnership with real estate firm Bedrock and seeks to "increase public-private collaboration in cities and advance more inclusive and sustainable models for urban development." 

Merritt holds a master's degree from Columbia University and a bachelor's degree from the University of Michigan.

References

1978 births
Columbia University alumni
University of Michigan alumni
Living people